is a song by Japanese Indie rock band Asian Kung-Fu Generation. It was released as the second single of their fifth studio album, World World World, on November 7, 2007, nearly a whole year after the release of the album's lead single. The single debuted in the top ten on the Oricon charts and was selected to be used as the seventh opening theme of the anime series Bleach.

Music video
The music video for "After Dark" was directed by Tadashi Tsukagoshi. The narrative video tells the surrealistic story of an ordinary young salaryman who wakes up one day to find wings sprouting out his back. At first, the man tries to hide them and continue going about his everyday life. However, as time goes on, the wings gradually grow larger and become increasingly harder to hide from his friends and co-workers. All the while, the scenes are intercut with a visual of AKG, expressing similar wings, playing the song in a giant birdcage.

While walking home one day, the man bears witness of a helpless window cleaner about to fall from a high-story building. The young man wishes to act, but hesitates due to the large crowd that has gathered around the scene. But when the cleaner begins to lose his grip, the young man throws off all hesitation, makes a dash towards him, spreads his wings, and soars to the rescue. At the same moment, the giant birdcage that had been holding AKG shatters to pieces. The video went on to win Best Rock Video at SPACE SHOWER Music Video Awards 08.

Track listing

Personnel
Masafumi Gotō – lead vocals, rhythm guitar
Kensuke Kita – lead guitar, background vocals
Takahiro Yamada – bass, background vocals
Kiyoshi Ijichi – drums
Asian Kung-Fu Generation – producer
Yusuke Nakamura – single cover art

Charts

References

Asian Kung-Fu Generation songs
2007 singles
Songs written by Masafumi Gotoh
Songs written by Takahiro Yamada (musician)
Bleach (manga) songs
2007 songs
Ki/oon Music singles